Agapanthia pustulifera is a species of longhorn beetle in the subfamily Lamiinae found  in Near East as Israel, Syria, Jordan. Agapanthia pustulifera's life cycle lasts 1 year.

References

pustulifera
Beetles described in 1905
Insects of the Middle East
Beetles of Asia